Murail is a surname. Notable people with the surname include:

Elvire Murail (born 1958), French author and screenwriter
Marie-Aude Murail (born 1954), French children's author
Tristan Murail (born 1947), French composer